The 1973 BYU Cougars football team represented Brigham Young University during the 1973 NCAA Division I football season. The Cougars were led by second-year head coach LaVell Edwards and played their home games at Cougar Stadium in Provo, Utah. The team competed as a member of the Western Athletic Conference, finishing tied for fourth with a conference record of 3–4.

Schedule

Personnel

Coaching staff
Head Coach: LaVell Edwards
Assistants: Dave Kragthorpe (OC/OL), Dick Felt (DB), J.D. Helm (RB), Mel Olson (JV), Tom Ramage (DL), Dewey Warren (QB/WR), Fred Whittingham (LB)

Game summaries

Utah

    
    
    
    
    
    
    
    
    
    
    
    

The first half was played in a blinding snowstorm. Gary Sheide tied the WAC single-season touchdown record of 21 in the third quarter shared by Virgil Carter (1966) and Danny White (1972). It was the most points BYU had scored against Utah to date.

Awards
All-WAC: DT Paul Linford (1st), SE Jay Miller (1st)

References

BYU
BYU Cougars football seasons
BYU Cougars football